The 2003 Nicholls State Colonels football team represented Nicholls State University as a member of the Southland Conference during the 2003 NCAA Division I-AA football season. Led by Daryl Daye in his fifth and final season as head coach, the Colonels finished the season with an overall record of 5–6 and a mark of 3–2 in conference play, placing third in the Southland. Nicholls State played home games at John L. Guidry Stadium in Thibodaux, Louisiana.

In 2005, Nicholls State forfeited five victories, including three conference wins, from the 2003 season because an ineligible player had participated in those games. With the forfeits, the Colonels' record dropped to 0–11 overall and 0–5 in conference play, placing them last out of six teams in the Southland.

Schedule

References

Nicholls State
Nicholls Colonels football seasons
College football winless seasons
Nicholls State Colonels football